Gauthameswarar Temple is a Hindu temple dedicated to Shiva located at Kumbakonam in Thanjavur district, Tamil Nadu, India.

Location
This temple is located to the eastern bank of the Mahamaham tank, Kumbakonam.

Presiding deity
The moolavar presiding deity, is found in his manifestation as Gauthameswarar. His consort, Parvati, is known as Soundara Nayaki. The thread around the kumba fell in this place and the linga was formed. It is said that Gowthama muni to get rid of the sin due to killing of a cow worshipped the deity of the temple.

Specialty 
12 Shiva temples are connected with Mahamaham festival which happens once in 12 years in Kumbakonam. They are :
Kasi Viswanathar Temple, 
Kumbeswarar Temple, 
Someswarar Temple, 
Nageswara Temple, 
Kalahasteeswarar Temple, 
Gowthameswarar Temple, 
Kottaiyur Kodeeswarar temple 
Amirthakalasanathar Temple, 
Banapuriswarar Temple, 
Abimukeswarar Temple, Kumbakonam, 
Kambatta Visvanathar Temple and 
Ekambareswarar Temple. 
This temple is one among them.

Kumbabishegam

The Kumbabishegam of the temple was held on 9 September 2015.

References

9.9.2015 Kumbabishegam 

Hindu temples in Kumbakonam
Shiva temples in Thanjavur district